Jacqueline Crump (born 3 August 1946), known professionally by her stage name Jacki Piper, is an English actress, best known for her appearances as the female juvenile lead in the British film comedies Carry On Up the Jungle (1970), Carry On Loving (1970), Carry On at Your Convenience (1971), and Carry On Matron (1972).

Career
Born in Birmingham, she trained at the Birmingham Theatre School. Her career began on stage in the mid-1960s, playing in repertory theatre in Rhyl, Wales, where she was billed as Jackie Crump. Her film career began with an appearance with Roger Moore in the film The Man Who Haunted Himself in 1970. Her other film roles not already mentioned include Doctor in Trouble (1970) and The Love Ban (1973). For her film roles she decided to use a stage name, becoming Jacki Piper.

Additionally she has had roles in several television series, including Z-Cars, the situation comedy The Fall and Rise of Reginald Perrin (in which she played the recurring role of market researcher Esther Pigeon), and Dangerfield.

Her other UK television roles include Thriller, playing the Bride in the episode Night Is the Time for Killing (18 January 1975); Return of the Saint, playing Sally in the episode Tower Bridge Is Falling Down (10 December 1978); Backup, playing Jury Foreman in the episode Touched (11 June 1997); Barbara, playing Angela Croft in the episode Neighbours (2 March 2003); and Wire in the Blood, playing Mrs Davis in the episode Still She Cries (19 January 2004).

In theatre she has starred in many West End productions and UK and international tours.

Piper still acts in TV, film and theatre, and regularly attends Carry On events. She currently lives with her husband in Richmond, Surrey; they have two sons.

Television credits
Softly, Softly (1967) as Mary Rhys
Softly, Softly: Taskforce (1973) as June
Men of Affairs (1973) as Enid Rudge
Z Cars (1974) as Beth Bramley
The Two Ronnies (1975) as Miss Willow (3 episodes)
Thriller (1975) as Bride
Hogg's Back (1975, Series 1, episodes 1-7) as Pearl
The Fall and Rise of Reginald Perrin (1976–1977) as Esther Pigeon (2 episodes)
Return of the Saint (1978) as Sally
The Bill (1991, 1997) as Mrs Cox (1991) and Mrs Leston (1997)
Backup (1997) as Jury Foreman
Doctors (2002) as Lesley
Barbara (2003) as Angela Croft
Wire in the Blood (2004) as Mrs Davis

Filmography
The Man Who Haunted Himself (1970) as Secretary (uncredited)
The Man Who Had Power Over Women (1970) as Receptionist
Carry On Up the Jungle (1970) as June
Doctor in Trouble (1970) as Cockney Girl
Carry On Loving (1970) as Sally Martin
Carry On at Your Convenience (1971) as Myrtle Plummer
Carry On Matron (1972) as Sister
The Love Ban (1973) as Pregnant Girl No.2
Mr Love (1985) as Ida
Run for Your Wife (2012) as Nurse

References

External links
 

1946 births
Living people
English film actresses
English television actresses
People from Birmingham, West Midlands